The Oath crisis was a World War I political conflict between the Imperial German Army command and the Józef Piłsudski-led Polish Legions.

Initially supporting the Central Powers against Imperial Russia, Piłsudski hoped for the defeat of one of the partitioning powers—Russia—with the help of the other two partitioning states, Austria-Hungary and Germany. However, after the Russian defeat in 1917 it became clear that the Central Powers were in no position to guarantee the independence of Poland. Despite the Act of November 5th of 1916 and the creation of Kingdom of Poland, it was apparent that the newly created state would be little more than a puppet buffer-state for Germany, a part of its Mitteleuropa plan.

At this point, Piłsudski decided to switch allegiances to gain the support of the Entente, particularly France and the United Kingdom, for the cause of Polish independence. A good pretext appeared in July 1917, when the Central Powers demanded that the soldiers of the Polish Legions swear allegiance and obedience to the Emperor Wilhelm II of Germany. Persuaded by Piłsudski, the majority of the soldiers of the 1st and 3rd Brigades of the Legions declined to take the oath. In the end, soldiers who were citizens of Austrian Empire (roughly 3,000) were then forcibly drafted into the Austro-Hungarian Army, demoted to the rank of private and sent to the Italian Front, while those born in other parts of occupied Poland were interned in prisoner of war camps in Szczypiorno and Beniaminów. Approximately 7,500 soldiers (mostly from the 2nd Brigade of the Legions) remained in the rump Polish Auxiliary Corps, part of the Polnische Wehrmacht. Piłsudski himself and his Chief of Staff Kazimierz Sosnkowski were arrested on 22 July 1917 and interned in the German fortress of Magdeburg.

In protest against the internment of Polish soldiers, the members of Provisional Council of State (the main authority in Kingdom at that time) resigned their seats, which led to full dissolution of Council. It was later replaced by the Regency Council.

See also
 Polish Army oaths

References 

1917 in Europe
Polish Legions in World War I
Germany–Poland relations
1917 in Germany
1917 in Poland